Jason's Deli is an American chain of fast casual restaurants founded in 1976 in Beaumont, Texas, by Joe Tortorice, Jr. There are currently over 245 locations in 29 states. The menu includes sandwiches, wraps, baked potatoes, pasta, soups, salads, and desserts, as well as catering items such as  boxed lunches.

History
It was founded in Beaumont, Texas on 30 November 1976 by Joe Tortorice Jr. and his partners Rusty Coco, Pete Verde and Pat Broussard. It was named for Tortorice's eldest son, Jay.

Joe and Rusty grew up in the food business. Their fathers owned neighborhood grocery stores in Beaumont. The original Jason's Deli location is still in operation at its original location at 112 Gateway St. The chain started franchising in 1988, with the first franchised store opened in Tucson, Arizona.

As of September 2019, there were 295 locations in 29 states. As of August 2008, Jason's Deli ranked #1 in annual sales in QSR Magazine's Top Ten list of restaurant groups with under 300 locations. The parent company, Deli Management, Inc., owns the majority of the deli restaurants.

In 2019, Joe died after a 19-month battle with cancer. He was 70.

Menu
The company offers a standard deli style menu including traditional sandwiches such as Po'boys and muffalettas. Each deli has a salad bar and a daily soup selection. They also serve other items, such as baked potatoes, pastas and salads.

In April 2005, the company completed a five-year plan to eliminate added trans-fats from its menu. In October 2008, the company eliminated high fructose corn syrup from its food.

Additionally, the company has eliminated MSG from all of its food.

Jason's Deli has also introduced gluten-free products. The deli also has ice cream for its customers, free of charge.

Awards
Jason's Deli won the 2008 Nation's Restaurant News Golden Chain Award, and Restaurants & Institutions’  2007 and 2006 Consumers’ Choice in Chains Gold Award in the sandwich segment.

Locations
Jason's Deli is found in 27 states.

 Alabama
 Arizona
 Arkansas
 Colorado
 Florida
 Georgia
 Illinois
 Indiana
 Iowa
 Kansas
 Kentucky
 Louisiana
 Maryland
 Mississippi
 Missouri
 Nebraska
 Nevada
 New Mexico
 North Carolina
 Ohio
 Oklahoma
 Pennsylvania
 South Carolina
 Tennessee
 Texas
 Virginia
 Wisconsin

See also
 List of delicatessens

References

External links
Jason's Deli Website
Nation's Restaurant News profile on Joseph V. Tortorice Jr.

Restaurants established in 1976
Fast casual restaurants
Restaurants in Texas
Companies based in Beaumont, Texas
Restaurant chains in the United States
Fast-food chains of the United States
1976 establishments in Texas
Delicatessens in the United States